Crêt is a village in the French commune of Ville-La-Grand, in the department of Haute-Savoie.

Villages in Auvergne-Rhône-Alpes